Slovenia competed at the 2020 Winter Youth Olympics in Lausanne, Switzerland from 9 to 22 January 2020.

Medalists

Alpine skiing

Boys

Girls

Biathlon

Boys

Girls

Mixed

Cross-country skiing

Curling

Slovenia qualified a mixed team of four athletes.
Mixed team

Mixed doubles

Freestyle skiing

Ice hockey

Luge

Nordic combined

Ski jumping

Ski mountaineering

Snowboarding

See also
Slovenia at the 2020 Summer Olympics

References

2020 in Slovenian sport
Nations at the 2020 Winter Youth Olympics
Slovenia at the Youth Olympics